LGen Brian Lachlan Melville Smith CMM CD (born April 22, 1939) was a Royal Canadian Air Force officer. He served as Commander of Canadian Forces Europe from 1989 to 1992 and as Deputy Commander in Chief of NORAD from 1992 to 1994.

References

Canadian Forces Air Command generals
1939 births
Living people
People from Winnipeg